Amarildo Souza do Amaral (born 2 October 1964), known simply as Amarildo, is a Brazilian retired footballer who played as a striker.

Football career
Born in Curitiba, Amarildo appeared in his country's Série A for four different teams: Operário Futebol Clube, Botafogo de Futebol e Regatas, Sport Club Internacional and São Paulo FC, the first three early into his career. Botafogo de Futebol e Regatas and Sport Club Internacional. He started playing football with Paraná-based Toledo Colônia Work, in 1982.

In the 1988–89 season Amarildo moved abroad, playing in Spain for Celta de Vigo and scoring 16 goals – fourth-best in La Liga, which included a brace in a 2–0 home win against Real Madrid – as the Galicians finished in tenth position. He spent the following three years in Italy, appearing for S.S. Lazio and A.C. Cesena and suffering Serie A relegation in his second year with the latter side.

After another spell in Spain's top flight with CD Logroñés (only one goal), Amarildo mainly represented F.C. Famalicão in Portugal. His best campaign with the club came in 1993–94 when he netted six times in 19 games in an eventual Primeira Liga relegation; he also represented the team in the second and third levels, interspersed with stints back in his homeland with São Paulo, União São João Esporte Clube and Esporte Clube Bahia, playing one match in the domestic cup with the latter in 1996.

References

External links
Futpédia profile 

1964 births
Living people
Footballers from Curitiba
Brazilian footballers
Association football forwards
Campeonato Brasileiro Série A players
Botafogo de Futebol e Regatas players
Associação Atlética Internacional (Limeira) players
Esporte Clube XV de Novembro (Piracicaba) players
Sport Club Internacional players
São Paulo FC players
União São João Esporte Clube players
Esporte Clube Bahia players
La Liga players
RC Celta de Vigo players
CD Logroñés footballers
Serie A players
Serie B players
S.S. Lazio players
A.C. Cesena players
Primeira Liga players
Liga Portugal 2 players
Segunda Divisão players
F.C. Famalicão players
Brazilian expatriate footballers
Expatriate footballers in Spain
Expatriate footballers in Italy
Expatriate footballers in Portugal
Brazilian expatriate sportspeople in Spain
Brazilian expatriate sportspeople in Italy
Brazilian expatriate sportspeople in Portugal